Juan Lerma Gómez (born June 8, 1955) is a Spanish neuroscientist and research professor at the Instituto de Neurociencias  in Alicante. Currently he is editor-in-chief of Neuroscience, the official journal of the  International Brain Research Organization, and scientific director of the programme "Severo Ochoa Center of Excellence" (2014-2022).

Biography
Lerma studied biology at the Complutense University of Madrid, and in 1979 started research at the Hospital Ramón y Cajal, under the mentorship of  Elio Garcia-Austt, obtaining his PhD in sciences at the Autonomous University of Madrid in 1983. After six years as a faculty member at  the hospital's Department of Research, he became a tenured staff researcher in the Instituto Cajal supported by the Consejo Superior de Investigaciones Científicas. In 1987, he moved to the Albert Einstein College of Medicine as a Fogarty Fellow, working with  Mike V. L. Bennett and R. Suzanne Zukin. In 1990, he returned to Spain at the Instituto Cajal where he established his own lab. In 2000, he was promoted to full professor. In 2004, he moved to the Instituto de Neurociencias (Neurosciences Institute) in Alicante. He became vice-director (2005-2007) and director (2007-2016).

Research
Lerma has focused his research on the molecular basis of neuronal communication, specifically on elucidating the properties and signaling mechanisms of glutamate receptors.

He described the existence of functional kainate receptors (KARs) in central neurons and applied single-cell RT-PCR to study neurotransmitter receptors. He described the KAR's fundamental role in controlling neuronal tissue excitability and epileptogenesis, demonstrating that KARs have a dual mechanism of signaling. He studied the role played by KARs at particular synapses and in the pathophysiology of brain diseases, in particular those related to mood disorders.

Publications
Lerma has published over 100 papers in peer-reviewed scientific journals.

Professional service
Chairman of the Pan-European Regional Committee of International Brain Research Organization (2010-2015)  
President of the Spanish Society for Neuroscience (2011-2013)
Member of the executive board of the Confederation of Spanish Scientific Societies (2013-2016)    
Secretary General of the Federation of European Neuroscience Societies (2016-2018)   
Member of the Board of the European Brain Council] (2014-2018)

Honors and awards
Scientific Merit Award by Generalitat Valenciana (2013)
Maximum Distinction for Research Career by National University of San Marcos, Perú (2010)
Elected member of the Academia Europaea (2010)
XI "Alberto Sols" Award (Best Research Career) (2006)
Member of European Dana Alliance for the Brain (EDAB) (2005)
XVIII Award CEOE Foundation to Sciences (2004)
Alonso Gabriel de Herrera Excellence  Award (2002)
Santiago Grisolía  Award (2002)
Elected member of the European Molecular Biology Organization] (2000)  
Distinction of the Health Sciences Foundation in Neurobiology (1998)

References

External links
 

Spanish neuroscientists
1955 births
Living people
Autonomous University of Madrid alumni
Members of the European Molecular Biology Organization
Members of Academia Europaea
Academic journal editors